The North West province of South Africa is divided, for local government purposes, into four district municipalities which are in turn divided into eighteen local municipalities.

In the following map, the district municipalities are labelled in capital letters and shaded in various different colours.

District municipalities

Local municipalities

Former municipalities

References

 
North West
North West (South African province)-related lists